Valea Seacă is a commune in Bacău County, Western Moldavia, Romania. It is composed of two villages, Cucova and Valea Seacă.

At the 2011 census, 64.3% of inhabitants were Romanians and 35.6% Roma.

Natives
 Andrei Ursache

References

Communes in Bacău County
Localities in Western Moldavia